Palaeoamyda is an extinct genus of softshell turtle belonging to the family Trionychidae. Remains have been found in the Eocene of Germany.

Taxonomy
Karl (1998) considered Palaeoamyda a synonym of Rafetoides austriacus (Peters, 1858), but subsequent re-description of the material showed that it was a distinct genus in its own right.

Description
Palaeoamyda is a three-clawed soft-shell turtle that can reach a length of about two feet. It is the largest species of turtles of Messel Pit Fossil Site. The carapace and plastron are not connected by bony prominences and the plastron shows bony plates reduced to small protrusions.

References

 H.-V. Karl - Zur Taxonomie der känozoischen Weichschildkröten Österreichs und Deutschlands (Trionychidae: Trionychinae).- Mitt. Geol. Und Paläont. Landesmuseum Joanneum, 56: 273- 328; Graz (1998).
 M. Morlo, S. Schaal, G. Mayr, C. Seiffert - Annotated taxonomic list of the Middle Eocene Vertebrata of Messel (2004) 
 Colin Tudge    Uncovering Our Earliest Ancestor
 Natuur informatie
 Hans-Volker Karl  Jurnal Article

Fossils of Germany
Eocene turtles
Extinct turtles